Dichomeris stratigera is a moth in the family Gelechiidae. It was described by Edward Meyrick in 1922. It is found in Amazonas, Brazil.

The forewings are pale purplish lilac with a streak of ochreous-yellow suffusion beneath the costa from the base to near the middle and a dark fuscous streak occupying the dorsal two-fifths of the wing throughout, its upper portion marked with a thick deep ferruginous streak from the base to the middle, where it forms a short triangular prominence upwards. The second discal stigma is ferruginous and there is a faint pale curved subterminal line edged ferruginous posteriorly. The hindwings are dark grey.

References

Moths described in 1922
stratigera